Oceans of Fantasy is the fourth studio album by Euro-Caribbean group Boney M. Released in September 1979, Oceans Of Fantasy became the second Boney M. album to top the UK charts and features the hits "El Lute / Gotta Go Home" and "I'm Born Again / Bahama Mama".

Background
The album had been preceded in the spring of 1979 by the single "Hooray! Hooray! It's a Holi-Holiday" (based on the American folksong "Polly Wolly Doodle"), one of the band's biggest hits. This was not included on Oceans of Fantasy but the B-side, "Ribbons of Blue" was, albeit in a heavily edited form. The original length of the track is 4:02, and songs like "Gotta Go Home" and "Bahama Mama" were also longer on 7" than on the actual album. 

As with the group's previous album, Nightflight to Venus, the original Hansa Records pressings of the album also included a range of different edits of certain tracks. 

The 1994 CD version pressed from album's rare East Germany copy (same with fourth pressing, but "Ribbons of Blue" is longer like the other pressings, 2:01 min.) unlike the common West Germany pressings with different edits.

"Bahama Mama" have 3 different edits on Hansa Records pressings of album:

First pressing - 3:33 min. (last verse repeated again) 

Second / Third pressing - same duration (several instruments removed from some parts) 

Fourth and CD pressing - 3:17 min. (the album version without the reprise on other versions)

Several pressings also contained the wrong running order on cover and labels, incorrectly listing "El Lute" as the opening track on side two, followed by "No More Chain Gang" and "Oceans of Fantasy" like only the first pressing.

The same pressing also features "Let It All Be Music" and "Gotta Go Home" segued together.

Oceans of Fantasy also features a guest appearance by Eruption's lead singer Precious Wilson on "Let It All Be Music" and the cover of Sam & Dave's "Hold On I'm Coming", which was also issued as Wilson's first solo single. The Argentinian pressing omitted "El Lute" in favour of "Hooray! Hooray! It's a Holi-Holiday".

The album was the only Boney M. album to feature a full track-by-track vocal credits list which confirmed that only two of the four band members, Liz Mitchell and Marcia Barrett, actually sang on the Boney M. records, and that producer Frank Farian sang the characteristic deep male vocal as well as high falsetto vocals (he even duetted with himself on the track "Bye Bye Bluebird"). Maizie Williams and Bobby Farrell did not take any part in the studio sessions, though performed vocals at Boney M's live concerts.

"No More Chain Gang" was covered by Turkish singer Tarkan as "Çok Ararsın Beni" ("You Call Me Too Much") on his debut album "Yine Sensiz" ("Without You Again") in 1992.

Track listing
Side A:
 "Let It All Be Music" (W. S. van Vugt) - 4:46
 "Gotta Go Home" (music: Frank Farian, Heinz Huth, Jürgen Huth; lyrics: Fred Jay) - 3:46
 "Bye Bye Bluebird" (Frank Farian, Fred Jay, George Reyam) - 4:42
 "Bahama Mama" - 3:17
 "Hold On I'm Coming" (Isaac Hayes, David Porter) - 4:05
 "Two of Us" (Lennon–McCartney) - 3:29
 "Ribbons of Blue" (Keith Forsey, L. Andrew) - 2:01

Side B:

 "Oceans of Fantasy" (Dietmar Kawohl, Didi Zill, Fred Jay) - 5:26
 "El Lute" (Frank Farian, Fred Jay, Hans Blum) - 5:09
 "No More Chain Gang" (Rainer Ehrhardt, Frank Farian, Fred Jay) - 5:12
 "I'm Born Again" (Traditional, Helmut Rulofs, Fred Jay) - 4:08
 "No Time to Lose" (Frank Farian, Fred Jay, Stefan Klinkhammer) - 3:26
 "Calendar Song (January, February, March ...)" (Traditional, Frank Farian) - 2:44

Personnel
 Liz Mitchell - lead vocals (A1, A6, A7, B2, B4 & B6), backing vocals (A1, A2, A4, A7, B2, B3 & B6)
 Marcia Barrett - lead vocals (A1 & B5), backing vocals (A1, A2, A4, A6, A7, B2, B3, B5 & B6)
 Frank Farian - lead vocals (A1, B2, B3), lead and backing vocals (A3 & B1) backing vocals (A1, A2, A4, A5, A6, A7, B3, B4, B5 & B6)
 Precious Wilson - guest lead vocals on track A1, lead and backing vocals on A5
 Linda Blake - voice of "Bahama Mama" on A4
 Bill Swisher - narrator on B2
 Gary Unwin - bass guitar
 Reinhard Besser - bass guitar
 Keith Forsey - drums
 Mats Björklund - guitar
 Nick Woodland - guitar
 Michael Cretu - keyboards
 Lisa Gordanier - alto saxophone 
 American Horns in Europe - brass instruments
 Lance Burton - baritone saxophone 
 Bobby Stern  - tenor saxophone 
 Geoff Stradling - trombone
 Jim Polivka - trumpet
 Scot Newton - trumpet
 Etienne Cap - trumpet on "Oceans of Fantasy"
 Walter Raab - trumpet on "Oceans of Fantasy"
 Karl Bartelmes - trumpet on "Oceans of Fantasy"
 Benny Gebauer - saxophone on "Oceans of Fantasy"
 Dino Solera - saxophone on "Oceans of Fantasy", pan flute on "El Lute"
 George Delagaye - trombone on "Oceans of Fantasy"
 Ludwig Rehberg Jr. - sound effects on "Oceans of Fantasy"
 The Original Trinidad Steel and Showband - performers

Production
 Frank Farian - producer
 Rainer M. Ehrhardt - production assistant
 Christian Kolonovits - arranger
 Keith Forsey - arranger
 Michael Cretu - arranger
 Stefan Klinkhammer - arranger
 Fred Schreier - sound engineer
 Michael Bestmann - sound engineer
 Tammy Grohé - sound engineer
 Manfred Vormstein  - art direction & design
 Jürgen F. Rogner - illustration
 Didi Zill - photography
 Recorded and mixed at Europasound Studios, Friedrichsdorf and Union Studio, Munich.

Charts

Weekly charts

Year-end charts

Certifications

Reissued
 1994: CD, BMG, 74321 21268 2 
 2007: CD, Sony BMG Music Entertainment, 88697082632
 2011: Boney M. Original Album Classics, 5 CD, Sony Music, 88697928702
 2017: Boney M. Complete, 9 LP, Sony Music, 88985406971

References

External links
 [ Allmusic, biography, discography etc.]
 Rate Your Music, detailed discography
 Discogs.com, detailed discography

1979 albums
Boney M. albums
Albums produced by Frank Farian
Atlantic Records albums
Hansa Records albums
Sire Records albums